The Holmdel Horn Antenna is a large microwave horn antenna that was used as a satellite communication antenna and radio telescope during the 1960s at Bell Telephone Laboratories in Holmdel Township, New Jersey, United States. It was designated a National Historic Landmark in 1989 because of its association with the research work of two radio astronomers, Arno Penzias and Robert Wilson. In 1965 while using this antenna, Penzias and Wilson discovered the cosmic microwave background radiation (CMBR) that permeates the universe. This was one of the most important discoveries in physical cosmology since Edwin Hubble demonstrated in the 1920s that the universe was expanding. It provided the evidence that confirmed George Gamow's and Georges Lemaître's "Big Bang" theory of the creation of the universe. This helped change the science of cosmology, the study of the history of the universe, from a field for unlimited theoretical speculation into a discipline of direct observation. In 1978 Penzias and Wilson received the Nobel Prize for Physics for their discovery.

Description 

The horn antenna at Bell Telephone Laboratories in Holmdel, New Jersey, was constructed in 1959 to support Project Echo, the National Aeronautics and Space Administration's passive communications satellites, which used large aluminized plastic balloons (satellite balloon) as reflectors to bounce radio signals from one point on the Earth to another.

The antenna is 50 feet (15 m) in length with a radiating aperture of 20 by 20 feet (6 by 6 m) and is constructed of aluminum. The antenna's elevation wheel, which surrounds the midsection of the horn, is 30 feet (10 m) in diameter and supports the weight of the structure by means of rollers mounted on a base frame. All axial or thrust loads are taken by a large ball bearing at the narrow apex end of the horn. The horn continues through this bearing into the equipment building or cab. The ability to locate receiver equipment at the horn apex, thus eliminating the noise contribution of a connecting line, is an important feature of the antenna. A radiometer for measuring the intensity of radiant energy is located in the cab.

The triangular base frame of the antenna is made from structural steel. It rotates on wheels about a center pintle ball bearing on a turntable track 30 feet (10 m) in diameter. The track consists of stress-relieved, planed steel plates individually adjusted to produce a track that is flat to about 1/64 inch (0.4 mm). The faces of the wheels are cone-shaped to minimize contact friction. A tangential force of 100 pounds (400 N) is sufficient to start the antenna rotating on the turntable. The antenna beam can be directed to any part of the sky using the turntable for azimuth adjustments and the elevation wheel to change the elevation angle or altitude above the horizon.

With the exception of the steel base frame, which was made by a local steel company, the antenna was fabricated and assembled by the Holmdel Laboratory shops under the direction of Mr. H. W. Anderson, who also collaborated on the design. Assistance in the design was also given by Messrs. R. O'Regan and S. A. Darby. Construction of the antenna was completed under the direction of Arthur Crawford.

When not in use, the turntable azimuth sprocket drive is disengaged, allowing the structure to "weathervane" and seek a position of minimum wind resistance. The antenna was designed to withstand winds of 100 miles per hour (160 km/h), and the entire structure weighs 18 short tons (16 tonnes).

A plastic clapboarded utility shed 10 by 20 feet (3 by 6 m) with two windows, a double door, and a sheet-metal roof, is located on the ground next to the antenna. This structure houses equipment and controls for the antenna and is included as a part of the designation as a National Historic Landmark. The antenna has not been used for several decades. In 2021, the site was sold to a developer, who is apparently interested in building high-end residences.

Technical
This type of antenna is called a Hogg or horn-reflector antenna, invented by Alfred C. Beck and Harald T. Friis in 1941. It was built by David C. Hogg. It consists of a flaring metal horn with a curved reflecting surface mounted in its mouth, at a 45° angle to the long axis of the horn. The reflector is a segment of a parabolic reflector, so the antenna is really a parabolic antenna which is fed off-axis. A Hogg horn combines several characteristics useful for radio astronomy. It is extremely broad-band, has calculable aperture efficiency, and the walls of the horn shield it from radiation coming from angles outside the main beam axis. The back and side lobes are therefore so minimal that scarcely any thermal energy is received from the ground. Consequently, it is an ideal radio telescope for accurate measurements of low levels of weak background radiation. The antenna has a gain of about 43.3 dBi and a beamwidth of about 1.5° at 2.39 GHz and an aperture efficiency of 76%.

See also
Andover Earth Station, location of another large Hogg horn antenna

References

Footnotes 
The original material in this article was taken from a National Park Service publication which in turn used the following sources: 
Richard Learner, Astronomy Through the Telescope (New York: Van Nostrand Reinhold Company, 1981), p. 154.
A.B. Crawford, D. C. Hogg, and L. E. Hunt, "Project Echo: A Horn Antenna for Space Communication," Bell System Technical Journal (July 1961), pp. 1095–1099.
Aaronson, Steve. "The Light of Creation: An Interview with Arno A. Penzias and Robert W. Wilson." Bell Laboratories Record. January 1979, pp. 12–18.
Abell, George O. Exploration of the Universe. 4th ed., Philadelphia: Saunders College Publishing, 1982.
Asimov, Isaac. Asimov's Biographical Encyclopedia of Science and Technology. 2nd ed., New York: Doubleday & Company, Inc., 1982.
Bernstein, Jeremy. Three Degrees Above Zero: Bell Labs in the Information Age. New York: Charles Scribner's Sons, 1984.
Chown, Marcus. "A Cosmic Relic in Three Degrees," New Scientist, September 29, 1988, pp. 51–55.
Crawford, A.B., D.C. Hogg and L.E. Hunt. "Project Echo: A Horn-Reflector Antenna for Space Communication," The Bell System Technical Journal, July 961, pp. 1095–1099.
Disney, Michael. The Hidden Universe. New York: Macmillan Publishing Company, 1984.
Ferris, Timothy. The Red Limit: The Search for the Edge of the Universe. 2nd ed., New York: Quill Press, 1978.
Friedman, Herbert. The Amazing Universe. Washington, DC: National Geographic Society, 1975.
Hey, J.S. The Evolution of Radio Astronomy. New York: Neale Watson Academic Publications, Inc., 1973.
Jastrow, Robert. God and the Astronomers. New York : W. W. Norton & Company, Inc., 1978.
H.T. Kirby-Smith U.S. Observatories: A Directory and Travel Guide. New York: Van Nostrand Reinhold Company, 1976.
Learner, Richard. Astronomy Through the Telescope. New York: Van Nostrand Reinhold Company, 1981.
Penzias, A.A., and R. W. Wilson. "A Measurement of the Flux Density of CAS A At 4080 Mc/s," Astrophysical Journal Letters, May 1965, pp. 1149–1154.

External links

Horn Antennas Antenna-Theory.com

Buildings and structures in Monmouth County, New Jersey
Holmdel Township, New Jersey
National Historic Landmarks in New Jersey
Physical cosmology
Radio telescopes
National Register of Historic Places in Monmouth County, New Jersey